This is a list of articles  related to the English county of Cumbria. See also the :Category:Cumbria  for links to the Cumbrian pages (e.g., towns, villages, railway stations, places of interest, people born in Cumbria, etc.)

People
See category  Cumbria below for people born in Cumbria. This lists people not native to Cumbria but who had connections with Cumbria.

Writers
 William Wordsworth – England's most famous poet, born in Cockermouth, lived in Grasmere
 John Ruskin – writer and conservationist – lived at Coniston
 W. G. Collingwood – writer and secretary to John Ruskin
 Arthur Ransome – writer of Swallows and Amazons
 Robert Southey – Lakes Poet
 Samuel Taylor Coleridge – Lakes poet
 Hartley Coleridge – writer, and son of Samuel Taylor Coleridge
 Thomas de Quincey – associated with the Lake Poets
 Beatrix Potter – children's author and conservationist
 Hugh Walpole – author – lived at Keswick
 Alfred Wainwright – guide book author – see List of Wainwrights
 John Cunliffe – author of Postman Pat, an animated BBC series featuring a postman in the fictional village of Greendale (inspired by the real valley of Longsleddale in Cumbria). The author lived in Kendal.
 Paul Kendall author of The Best Bacon Butty in Cumbria, and a number of other books unrelated to Cumbria.

Artists

 William James Blacklock – 19th century landscape artist
 Josefina de Vasconcellos – sculptress
 Henry Holiday – Stained glass window designer
 Edward Burne-Jones – Stained glass window designer
 William Morris – Stained glass window maker
 Kurt Schwitters – German artist who came to live in Ambleside
 L. S. Lowry – artist who created many drawings of Cumbria
 Winifred Nicholson – painter, who lived near Lanercost
 Ken Russell – film director, who lived in Borrowdale, Keswick for a while. Several of his films included local scenes.

Architects
 Sir Robert Smirke – architect of many major buildings, including Lowther Castle, and Carlisle citadel
 Sydney Smirke – architect of several important buildings in Whitehaven
 Anthony Salvin – restorer and architect of several important buildings in Cumbria, including Lanercost Priory, Hutton-in-the-Forest, Muncaster Castle, and Derwent Isle House
 Thomas Rickman – architect – various, including Rose Castle and Scaleby Castle
 Giles Gilbert Scott – architect – Ambleside church
 William Butterfield – architect – several churches
 Augustus Pugin – architect – railway cottages at Windermere station
 C.F.A. Voysey – architect – houses at Bowness-on-Windermere and Kendal
 Philip Webb – architect – Brampton, St Martin's Church
 Hardwicke Rawnsley – ecologist, and founder of the National Trust.
 Francis Dunnery – singer and songwriter, formerly of the band It Bites
 Princess Louise, Duchess of Argyll – daughter of Queen Victoria, and early supporter of the National Trust in its birthplace at Borrowdale near Keswick. She was the Trust's first President.
 Anne Clifford – restorer of churches at Appleby-in-Westmorland, Ninekirks, Brougham, Mallerstang; and castles at Brough, Skipton and Appleby.
 Thomas Mawson – landscape gardener.
 Donald Campbell – World Record Water Speed challenger.
 Fletcher Christian – master's mate on board .
 Chris Bonington – mountaineer, now living in Cumbria.
 John Paul Jones – Naval officer in the American Revolutionary War, born in Kirkcudbrightshire who began his maritime career sailing out of Whitehaven as apprentice aboard the Friendship at only seventy years of age. Years later he returned in  hoping to sink all Whitehaven's ships anchored in harbour (numbered between 200 and 400), before setting the town itself ablaze.
 George Fox and Margaret Fell – important players in the founding of the Religious Society of Friends who lived at Swarthmoor Hall.
 Ann Macbeth – a famous embroideress who lived at Patterdale.
 William Cavendish, 7th Duke of Devonshire – whose home was at Holker Hall.
 Edward Haughey, Baron Ballyedmond – whose home is Corby Castle.
 Stan Laurel – of Laurel & Hardy fame. Born in Ulverston.
 British Sea Power – half of the band come from near Kendal, Cumbria
 Wild Beasts – indie band from Kendal, Cumbria
 Christine McVie - musician in band Fleetwood Mac.  Born in Bouth, Cumbria.

Sport

Football
 Carlisle United F.C. – only league team in Cumbria. Currently playing in League Two
 Barrow A.F.C. – currently playing in the Conference National
 Workington A.F.C. – currently playing in the Conference North

Rugby League
 Barrow Raiders - based in the Betfred Championship 
 Workington Town & Whitehaven – based in Betfred League1

Natural materials
 Graphite – used in the pencil making industry in Keswick. The graphite deposit found at Borrowdale was extremely pure and solid and it could easily be sawed into sticks. This was and remains the only deposit of graphite ever found in this solid form.
 Gypsum – used in the Plasterboard industry
 Coal – west coast mining industry, e.g. Haig Pit at Whitehaven
 Haematite – west coast mining industry, e.g. Florence mine at Egremont
 Anhydrite – found at Whitehaven, where it was used in the early manufacture of sulphuric acid, and at Kirkby Thore, where it is used in the Plaster industry
 Slate is found at various locations throughout Cumbria, with the Honister slate mine at Borrowdale now a major tourist attraction
 Lead was mined extensively in Nenthead from the 18th century until the early part of the 20th century

Industrial processes
 Nuclear reprocessing – at Sellafield
 Thorp nuclear fuel reprocessing plant – part of Sellafield
 Blast furnace – e.g. the Duddon Furnace near Broughton-in-Furness
 Bessemer process – invented by Henry Bessemer and used at the Workington Steel Works
 Wind power and Wind generators surrounding much of the Lake District
 Very Low Frequency transmitters – at Anthorn and Skelton for submarine communications
 Phosphoric acid and Sulphuric acid – once made in vast quantities at the Marchon Chemical Company plant at Whitehaven. Phosphoric acid was made by adding the manufactured sulphuric acid to Calcium phosphate rock, brought by ship from Morocco to Whitehaven harbour.

Major employers
 Cumbria County Council
 BAE Systems Submarine Solutions, once Vickers Shipbuilding and Engineering Ltd, and Vickers – in Barrow-in-Furness
 BNFL – British Nuclear Fuels – owners and operators of the Nuclear reprocessing site – at Sellafield, and the world's first nuclear power station, Calder Hall, now closed.
 McVitie's part of United Biscuits – the UK's second largest biscuit factory in Carlisle
 Corus Group, previously British Steel plc – makers of railway lines in Workington – closed down Summer 2006.

History
 Cumbria is a county where you can find many Stone circles – including the impressive Castlerigg stone circle near Keswick
 Cumbria is on the border between England and Scotland, and defensive Peel towers were built to protect the English from invaders, the Border Reivers.
 The Roman empire built Hadrian's Wall dividing England and Scotland, and various forts throughout Cumbria, including Hardknott Roman Fort in Eskdale
 The Dovenby Hall estate in Dovenby, near Cockermouth, dates from 1154 and has been used, amongst other things, as a private residence, a mental institution, and, most recently, as home of the Ford Rally Team.
 Clifton Moor Skirmish – the last battle on English soil between the Jacobite forces of Prince Charles Stuart and the English army commanded by the Duke of Cumberland at Clifton near Penrith.

Other pages of interest
 The year 2001 proved to be a terrible year for Cumbria because of the foot and mouth crisis, suffering 893 confirmed cases of the disease out of a total of 2030 cases in the UK. The effects of some 10 months of this crisis on some businesses was immense, and many rural pubs, B&B's and other tourist related shops closed for ever due to little income during 2001. See more information about foot and mouth disease.
 Cumberland sausage – local food product
 Cumbrian dialect – a colourful, descriptive dialect that borrows word origins from Cumbric, Norse and other ancient languages.
 Cumbrian MPs – a list of past and present Cumbrian members of parliament
 Herdwick sheep – the local fell sheep, gives some of the best lamb meat available
 The Spadeadam Rocket Establishment, near Carlisle, was opened in the late 1950s as a test area for the British Intermediate Range Ballistic Missile (IRBM) –  Blue Streak
 Cumbria is one of the few places in England where you can still find the red squirrel, the osprey, the hen harrier, and the golden eagle
 Center Parcs – operators of the Whinfell Forest Oasis holiday village near Penrith
 Depleted uranium – in the Solway Firth from weapons testing (at Eskmeals and Dundrennan Range) and weapons dumping
 Jennings Brewery – in Cockermouth
 Musical Stones of Skiddaw at the Keswick Museum and Art Gallery
 The Luck of Edenhall – a legendary drinking glass
 Dykes – Cumbrian surname
 Kendal Mint Cake

Topics
Cumbria